Gustaf Ljunggren may refer to:
 Gustaf Ljunggren (academician)
 Gustaf Ljunggren (chemist)
 Gustaf Ljunggren (athlete)